Verkhnyaya Solyanka is a rural locality (a village) in Andreyevskoye Rural Settlement, Kishertsky District, Perm Krai, Russia. The population was 313 as of 2010. There are 6 streets.

Geography 
Verkhnyaya Solyanka is located 22 km east of Ust-Kishert (the district's administrative centre) by road. Dunino is the nearest rural locality.

References 

Rural localities in Kishertsky District